Brandon Jay McLaren (born October 15, 1982) is a Canadian actor. He made his first screen appearance in the television series Just Cause (2002). He has been known for his main and supporting roles in shows such as Graceland, Power Rangers S.P.D., Ransom, Harper's Island, and Slasher. He has also had roles in the feature films She's the Man, Tucker & Dale vs. Evil, and Dead Before Dawn.

In 2005, he gained prominence with the main role of Jack Landors a.k.a. Red SPD Ranger in Power Rangers S.P.D.. Since then, he has had a variety of roles in several films and television series.

Early life
McLaren was born in Vancouver, British Columbia, Canada to Ira and Denise McLaren. He graduated from Johnston Heights Secondary School in Surrey, British Columbia, Canada, and received a bachelor's degree in Human Biology from the University at Albany, SUNY.

Career
McLaren was a guest star in the episode "Bloodlines" of Blade: The Series and was featured throughout the first season of The N original television series The Best Years as Devon Sylver, the love interest of lead character Samantha Best. He is also well known to Canadian audiences for his role of Lenin, Sam's love interest, in the popular show Being Erica, and he portrayed Jamil Dexter as a recurring role on TNT's Falling Skies. He also starred as U.S. Customs agent Dale Jakes on Graceland, Marco on Girlfriends' Guide to Divorce, Danny Booker on Chicago Fire and Bennet Ahmed on The Killing. He is also a main role in the Disney+ series, Turner & Hooch.

Personal life
McLaren was previously married to Miekka Tennent. They divorced in 2014.

Awards
McLaren was awarded the Golden Maple Award for Best Actor in a TV series broadcast in the U.S. in 2015, for his role on Graceland.

Filmography

Films

Television

References

External links

1980 births
Black Canadian male actors
Canadian male film actors
Canadian people of Grenadian descent
Canadian people of Trinidad and Tobago descent
Canadian male television actors
Living people
Male actors from Vancouver
University at Albany, SUNY alumni